Shannon O'Neill may refer to:
 Shannon O'Neill (politician)
 Shannon O'Neill (comedian)